Pulaski Village Historic District is a national historic district located at Pulaski in Oswego County, New York.  The district includes 27 contributing buildings and two contributing sites located at the intact historic residential and commercial core of the village.  The buildings include seven residences, two churches, a courthouse, and 26 commercial structures.

It was listed on the National Register of Historic Places in 1983.

References

Historic districts on the National Register of Historic Places in New York (state)
Historic districts in Oswego County, New York
National Register of Historic Places in Oswego County, New York